Basile Georges Casmoussa (born 25 October 1938 in Qaraqosh, Iraq) is a Syriac Catholic archbishop. He was Apostolic Visitor of the Syrian Catholics in Western Europe and Archbishop Emeritus of the Syrian Catholic Archeparchy of Mosul, Iraq.

Casmoussa was ordained as a priest in June 1962 and worked for three decades as the editor of Christian Source and was active in the International Union of the Catholic Press. He was elected Archbishop of the Syriac Catholic Archeparchy of Mosul in May 1999, taking up the post in December. The eparchy of Mosul has 35,000 Syriac Catholics, 36 priests, and 55 religious. Although many Iraqi Christians have left the country because of attacks following the 2003 invasion of Iraq, Casmoussa chose to stay.

Casmoussa was kidnapped, reportedly by gunmen in Mosul, at the age of 66 on January 17, 2005. Although there were fears that this marked a new wave of attacks on Christians in Iraq, it appeared that the motive was principally for ransom, reportedly US$200,000. The kidnapping was widely condemned. The Archbishop was freed one day later on January 18 with no ransom being paid.

On Tuesday, March 1, 2011, Pope Benedict XVI, gave his consent to the canonical election (made by the Synod of Bishops of the Patriarchal Syriac Catholic Church) of Father Yohanna Petros Mouche, until now the Protosyncellus (Vicar General) of the Archeparchy of Mosul, as the new Archbishop-elect of the Archeparchy of Mosul, succeeding Casmoussa. Casmoussa was transferred to the Syriac Catholic Patriarchal Curia.

On Monday, January 13, 2014, Pope Francis appointed him Apostolic Visitor of the Syriac Catholics in Western Europe.

On Wednesday, June 21, 2017, Pope Francis accepted his resignation as Apostolic Visitor of the Syriac Catholics in Western Europe and appointed Mgr. Rami Al-Kabalan as his successor.

Positions

References

External links

Interview with Catholic World News
BBC history of Iraqi Christians
Biography, from Catholic Hierarchy

1938 births
Living people
20th-century Eastern Catholic archbishops
21st-century Eastern Catholic archbishops
Syriac Catholic bishops
Iraqi Eastern Catholics
Iraqi archbishops
People from Mosul
People from Bakhdida
Kidnapped Iraqi people